Pierre Dumayet, (February 24, 1923 - November 17, 2011), was a French journalist, screenwriter and producer, who was a pioneer of French television. Dumayet is best known for presenting the television show Lectures pour tous.

Filmography

References

1923 births
2011 deaths
People from Yvelines
French television presenters
French television writers
French television producers
20th-century French journalists
20th-century French writers